Emly Starr (born 5 September 1957 in Laarne, Belgium; birth name Marie-Christine Mareels) is a Belgian disco singer. She also appeared in the documentary film Santiago Lovers by Romano Ferrari.

She has participated in several dance and song contests. In the World Popular Song Festival at Tokyo in 1980 with the entry "Mary Brown", she was finalist as Emly Starr Explosion.

Starr entered the Eurovision Song Contest 1981, where she performed "Samson" and finished in 13th place.

In 1985, she appeared in the role of Erika in the film Jumping (Dutch: Springen) directed by Jean-Pierre De Decker, a film which was submitted to the 59th Academy Awards for Best Foreign Language Film but not nominated, where she sang the song "Jump in the Dark", that was in the film's soundtrack.

Discography

Singles
 "Tears of Gold" / idem instr. (1976)
 "Back to the Beatles" / "I'll risk it" (1977)
 "Cha Cha D'Amore" / idem instr. (1977)
 "Dance of love" / "My Time (is your time)" (1977)
 "No No Sheriff" / idem instr. (1978)
 "Santiago Lover" / idem instr. (1978)
 "Baby love me" / idem instr. (1979)
 "Hey Aloha (Honolulu)" / "Baby love me" (1979)
 "Do Svidaanja" / "Bee bop boogie" (1980)
 "Get Up" / "Music in the air" (1980)
 "Mary Brown" / "Rock 'n' Roll Woman" (1980, Japão)
 "Sweet Lips" / "Hang On" (1981)
 "Let Me Sing" / "Baby I need your loving" (1981)
 "Samson" (Samson & Delilah) (1981, in Dutch and English)
 "Dynamite" / idem instr. (1982)
 "Key To Your Heart" / "The Letter" (1983)
 "Jump in the Dark" / "I know (how to love you)" (1986)
 "Rock and roll woman" / "I need help" (1980–1981)

Albums
 1980: Emly Starr
 1980: The Best of Emly Starr Explosion
 1981: Emly Starr Explosion
 1982: Greatest Hits
 1984: The Letter
 2008: Greatest Hits (CD)

External links
  in Dutch, French and English
 Tokio's contest
 

1957 births
Living people
Eurovision Song Contest entrants for Belgium
Belgian women singers
Eurovision Song Contest entrants of 1981
People from Laarne